Dawganova is a 1995 all-instrumental album by American musician David Grisman, recorded with his group The David Grisman Quintet. It's a unique collection of Latin rhythms and melodies inspired by the group's  newest member, Argentine guitar virtuoso, Enrique Coria. Five Grisman originals are accompanied by classical Latin standards: "El Cumbanchero", "Tico Tico", "Manha de Carnaval" and  the Nat "King" Cole classic "Nature Boy".

In his Allmusic review, Stephen Thomas Erlewine stated "Grisman's distinctive blend of bluegrass, folk, jazz, and, in this case, latin music is energetic and very impressive."

Track listing 
All songs by David Grisman unless otherwise noted.
 "Dawganova" – 6:50
 "Manha de Carnaval" (Luiz Bonfá) – 7:06
 "Barkley's Bug" – 5:37
 "Nature Boy" (eden ahbez) – 7:49
 "El Cumbanchero" (Rafael Hernández Marín) – 4:38
 "Brazilian Breeze" – 5:55
 "Tico Tico" (Zequinha de Abreu) – 4:30
 "April's Wedding Bossa" – 6:43
 "Caliente" – 6:11

Personnel
David Grisman – mandolin, mandola
Enrique Coria – guitar
Matt Eakle – flute, bass flute
Jim Kerwin – bass
Joe Craven – percussion, violin, cover design

References

1995 albums
David Grisman albums
Acoustic Disc albums